The Lion Cubs, also known as Ashbal, are child soldiers in the Middle East.

Lion Cubs – Al Qaeda
The Ashbal Al Qaeda Lion Cubs of Al Qaeda have appeared in Morocco, Iraq, and places in between.

Lion Cubs – Saddam Hussein
Since 1991, Saddam Hussein's Ashbal child soldiers in Iraq employed training techniques intended to desensitize the youth to violence, including frequent beatings and deliberate cruelty to animals. The exact numbers of the Ashbal Saddam were not known, but there were an estimated 8,000 members in Baghdad alone.

Lion Cubs – Lebanon
Ashbal in Lebanon since spring 1969 have been led by Palestinian Arab leaders like Yasser Arafat, A. Shukairy and George Habash, who initially dubbed them 'baby tigers' and were active in the 1970s and 1980s. Some were as young as eight years of age.

The boys were taught to dismantle, clean and reassemble rifles, pistols and machine guns and are allowed to fire live ammunition. They underwent a Mau Mau-like hardening course in which each boy was required to tear apart a live chicken to develop a lust for killing. Chants which these children, termed 'junior terrorists', had to learn and repeat included: "Oh Zionists, do you think you are safe? Drinking blood is the habit of our men" and "We are from Fatah! We have come to kill you all!"

Lion Cubs – ISIS

The Cubs of the Caliphate is a programme by the Islamic State of Iraq and the Levant to recruit and train child soldiers between the ages of 10 and 15.

See also
Die Wahre Religion

References

Factions of the Islamic State of Iraq and the Levant
Child soldiers
2017 disestablishments in Syria
2014 establishments in Syria
Military units and formations established in 2014
Military units and formations disestablished in 2017